Chhutto Baloch Qabila is a Baloch tribe in Balochistan, Sindh. Panjab

The people who cultivate the Crown lands of Kalat in various niahats in Jhalawan are known as the Khan's ulus or subjects, and, with a few exceptions, are under the direct administrative control of His Highness' officials and have no direct concern with the tribal Chiefs.

As per a 1901 study, out of the 6,245 members of this class 2,087 are Chhuttas inhabiting the Kirthar Range and Dariaro in Balochistan on the Sindh, and 468 are Marris.

The Chhutto Baloch community lives in Sindh, Punjab, Balochistan and also in Saudi Arabia, Oman yaman sham Qatar, Dubai and Iran. 26 sub-castes make up this tribe, including Kandani, Halani, Bahloolzai, Banglani, Mehrabani, Muridani, Eishani, Notani, Birhamani, Hamarkani, Delara, Marcha, Galarani, Changani and Burfatani.

The Chief Sardar of this tribe is Mohammad Saleh Bhootani.Baloch
Creator abdulrauf kandani chhutta

References 

Social groups of Pakistan
Baloch tribes